Common blackberry is a common name for several plants and may refer to:

Rubus allegheniensis, native to eastern North America
Rubus fruticosus, native to Europe